Bernd Hoss (19 June 1939 – 6 April 2016) was a German football manager.

Hoss managed 34 games for SpVgg Blau-Weiß 1890 Berlin in the Bundesliga during his career.

References

External links 
 

1939 births
2016 deaths
People from Nürtingen
Sportspeople from Stuttgart (region)
German football managers
Bundesliga managers
People from the Free People's State of Württemberg
Karlsruher SC managers
Tennis Borussia Berlin managers
SC Freiburg managers
1. FSV Mainz 05 managers
Wormatia Worms managers
Wuppertaler SV managers
VfL Osnabrück managers
Freiburger FC managers